Molecular laser isotope separation (MLIS) is a method of isotope separation, where specially tuned lasers are used to separate isotopes of uranium using selective ionization of hyperfine transitions of uranium hexafluoride molecules. It is similar to AVLIS. Its main advantage over AVLIS is low energy consumption and use of uranium hexafluoride instead of vaporized uranium.

MLIS was conceived in 1971 at the Los Alamos National Laboratory.

MLIS operates in cascade setup, like the gaseous diffusion process. Instead of vaporized uranium as in AVLIS the working medium of the MLIS is uranium hexafluoride which requires a much lower temperature to vaporize. The UF6 gas is mixed with a suitable carrier gas (a noble gas including some hydrogen) which allows the molecules to remain in the gaseous phase after being cooled by expansion through a supersonic de Laval nozzle. A scavenger gas (e.g. methane) is also included in the mixture to bind with the fluorine atoms after they are dissociated from the UF6 and inhibit their recombination with the enriched UF5 product. In the first stage the expanded and cooled stream of UF6 is irradiated with an infrared laser operating at the wavelength of 16 µm. The mix is then irradiated with another laser, either infrared or ultraviolet, whose photons are selectively absorbed by the excited 235UF6, causing its photolysis to 235UF5 and fluorine. The resultant enriched UF5 forms a solid which is then separated from the gas by filtration or a cyclone separator. The precipitated UF5 is relatively enriched with 235UF5 and after conversion back to UF6 it is fed to the next stage of the cascade to be further enriched. 
The laser for the excitation is usually a carbon dioxide laser with output wavelength shifted from 10.6 µm to 16 µm; the photolysis laser may be a  excimer laser operating at 308 nm, however infrared lasers are mostly used in existing implementations.

The process is complex: many mixed UFx compounds are formed which contaminate the product and are difficult to remove.  The United States, France, United Kingdom, Germany and South Africa have reported termination of their MLIS programs, however Japan still has a small scale program in operation.

The Commonwealth Scientific and Industrial Research Organisation in Australia has developed the SILEX pulsed laser separation process. GE, Cameco and Hitachi are currently involved in developing it for commercial use.

See also

Atomic vapor laser isotope separation
Australian Atomic Energy Commission
Calutron
Nuclear fuel cycle
Nuclear power

References

External links
Laser isotope separation uranium enrichment
Reed J. Jenson, O’Dean P. Judd, and J. Allan Sullivan Separating Isotopes with Lasers Los Alamos Science vol.4, 1982.
Article in New York Times (August 20, 2011) regarding General Electric's plans to build a commercial laser enrichment facility in Wilmington, North Carolina, USA. 
Silex information

Chemical processes
Isotope separation
Uranium